Zafarobod is an urban-type settlement in Bukhara Region, Uzbekistan. It is part of Konimex District. The town population in 2002 was 5,800 people. Until 2018 it was part of the Bukhara Region (Gʻijduvon District).

References

Populated places in Navoiy Region
Urban-type settlements in Uzbekistan